Aglossosia is a genus of moths in the subfamily Arctiinae.

Species
 Aglossosia albescens
 Aglossosia aurantiacella
 Aglossosia chrysargyria
 Aglossosia consimilis
 Aglossosia deceptans
 Aglossosia flavimarginata
 Aglossosia fusca
 Aglossosia fuscicincta
 Aglossosia metaleuca
 Aglossosia persimilis
 Aglossosia semisericea

References
Natural History Museum Lepidoptera generic names catalog

Lithosiini
Moth genera